The Anambra State All Progressive Congress is the state chapter of the All Progressive Congress Nigeria in Anambra State, Nigeria. It is currently chaired by Emeka Ibe Its publicity Secretary is Okelo Madukaife  Prominent public figures includes Nigeria's Minister of Labour and Employment Dr. Chris Ngige , Executive Secretary Pension Transitional Arrangement Directorate (PTAD)  Barr. Sharon Ikeazor

References

Politics of Anambra State